"Te Espero" is a song by American singer Prince Royce and Argentine singer María Becerra. The song was released on March 3, 2022. The music video premiered on the same day as its audio release. The song samples Cutting Crew's "(I Just) Died in Your Arms" (1986).

Reception

Business performance 
The single peaked at number 1 on Billboard magazine Tropical Airplay chart, marking Royce's 22nd number 1 and Becerra's first on the chart. In addition, the song reached the number 1 position on tropical music radio stations in the United States, Puerto Rico, Chile, Ecuador, the Dominican Republic, Colombia and Panama.

Music video 
The video clip was directed by Julián Levy and its shooting took place in Buenos Aires for two days. The concept of the video develops a love story supported by a sensual dance during a police investigation, where Royce appears with a bulletproof vest and armed to rescue María Becerra who finds himself in the middle of multiple shots and chases.

Charts

Weekly charts

Certifications

References

2022 singles
2022 songs
María Becerra songs
Music videos shot in Argentina
Prince Royce songs
Sony Music Latin singles
Spanish-language songs